is a Canadian-Japanese anime series, produced by Shogakukan-Shueisha Productions, Spin Master and TV Tokyo and animated by Bones. The anime revolves around four teenage humans named Guren, Ceylan, Toxsa, and Chooki, who find an interdimensional portal to Quarton where they are chosen by the Guardians to become the new generation of Tenkai Knights and prevent Vilius from taking control of both worlds.

The anime first aired in both the United States and Canada through Cartoon Network and Teletoon on August 24, 2013. It was later aired in Japan on TV Tokyo beginning April 5, 2014.

Four theme songs are used for the series: one opening theme and three closing themes. The opening theme is "Get the Glory" by Ayako Nakanomori. The third ending, is sung by Pile.

Episodes list

Tenkai Knights: Origins
Tenkai Knights: Origins is a web series that acts as a prequel to Tenkai Knights. Each webisode tells the story of how Vilius betrayed the Guardians and his fellow knights to become the evil leader of the Corrupted Army. The web series has not been released in Japan.

References
 Official TV Tokyo website
 Cartoon Network Official Website

Tenkai Knights